Vic Lockman ( October 19, 1927 – June 1, 2017) was an American Christian cartoonist and comic strip writer. He started cartooning from a young age, taught by his father. He was once head of the art department for the School of Aviation Medicine at Randolph Field, Texas. He was married and had 6 children. His son, Mark Thomas Lockman (1952–1989) was a journalist, to whom one of Vic's cartoon books was dedicated.

Among the many comic strips and cartoons he created, Lockman might be most known for his characters created for Disney comics in 1960; Newton Gearloose and Moby Duck.

In 1985 Lockman created “Who’s Behind the South African Crisis?”, the pro-apartheid comic  as a supplement to newsletters published by the Canadian League of Rights. According to Michael Beukert "While the blatant racism expressed by the cartoon is shocking, it is worth noting that it outlines many of the tropes which were commonly articulated by right-wing and even liberal commentators sympathetic to South Africa. Furthermore, the most violently racist of the tropes produced below — including the idea that Africans are incapable of governing themselves, and the threat of black violence against young white women — were contemporaneously being repeated by newspaper columnists in places like the Toronto Sun."

Books and various publications

Various
 Biblical Economics in Comics
 Books/Bible Memory Chart
 Catechism For Young Children With Cartoons - Book I, Q. 1 through Q. 71
 Catechism For Young Children With Cartoons - Book II, Q. 72 through Q. 145
 Church History for Young Children (The Reformation)
 Coloring Book (Catechism) - Book I
 Coloring Book (Catechism) - Book II
 English Grammar & Stories With Cartoons
 Father Time (Evolution Defeated)
 Forgotten Minority (Exclusive Psalmody)
 God's Law for Modern Man
 How Shall We Worship God?
 In These Last Days
 Infant Baptism
 Instrumental Music & Worship
 John G. Schmitz v. Big Brother
 Money, Banking and Usury
 Psalm Singing for Kids
 Reading & Understanding the Bible
 Revelation, The Book of
 Spanish Catechism for Young Children With Cartoons - Book I, Q. 1 through Q. 71
 Spanish Catechism for Young Children With Cartoons - Book II, Q. 72 through Q. 145
 Super Bug... Gospel in the Woods
 The Lord's Supper (Closed Communion)
 Water, Water Everywhere (The Great Flood)
 Westminster Confession of Faith (Summary Outline)
 Westminster Shorter Catechism With Cartoons, Book I
 Westminster Shorter Catechism With Cartoons, Book II
 Who is God? (Q4-6, WSC)
 Who Stopped the Clock (70 Wks/Dan.9) 
 Who's Behind the South African Crisis? - a pro-Apartheid Comic strip from 1985
 Worship Principle, Elements & Circumstances

Drawing books
 Big Book of Cartooning (In Christian Perspective), Book I (1990)
 Big Book of Cartooning (In Christian Perspective), Book II, Animals (1991)
 Big Book of Cartooning, Machines
 Cartooning for Young Children, Book I
 Cartooning for Young Children, Book II
 Drawing for Girls
 Miracle Art, Trick Drawing
 Trace & Learn Drawing Book

12-page tracts
 Christian Baptism
 Counterfeit Covenant
 D-A-I-S-Y vs. T.U.L.I.P, Who's in Control, Man or God?
 God's Inspired Word
 Heresy vs. Creeds
 Justification By Faith Alone
 The Lord's Supper
 Roman Catholic Mass
 T.U.L.I.P.

See also
 Newton Gearloose
 Moby Duck

References
 The Big Book of Cartooning, by Vic Lockman, Book I.

External links
 
 Vic Lockman's official website
 Comiclopedia entry
 Italian Wikipedia entry
The 1985 Pro-Apartheid Comic by Disney Cartoonist Vic Lockman

1927 births
2017 deaths
American Christians
American comic strip cartoonists
Disney comics writers
Disney comics artists